Dimetofrine (or dimethophrine) is a cardiac stimulant.

Further reading
 

Cardiac stimulants
Phenols
Phenylethanolamines
Resorcinol ethers